The Rock 'n' Roll Virginia Beach Half Marathon is an annual half marathon road running event which takes place in Virginia Beach, United States, on the first Sunday of September.

Owned and organized by the IRONMAN Group, part of Wanda Sports Holdings, the event was inaugurated in 2001 as part of the Rock 'n' Roll Marathon Series which began with the Rock 'n' Roll San Diego Marathon three years earlier. Almost 11,000 people completed the race at the first event, over half of whom were women. The elite race attracted high calibre American and international athletes, with Deena Drossin and Shadrack Hoff taking the first elite titles. Around 16,000 runners participated in the 2004 event.

The 21.0975-kilometer (13.1-mile) course begins at the Virginia Beach Convention Center within the city, moving on to follow Pacific Avenue and Atlantic Avenue towards the oceanfront. The course then heads south on General Booth Boulevard, looping back north along Prosperity Road near Red Wing Lake Golf Course just after the halfway point. Passing Lake Christine, the route runs back onto General Booth Boulevard at the tenth mile. The course continues north for three miles until the finishing point in the middle of Virginia Beach Boardwalk.

The elite race frequently features world class runners from East Africa and Asia. The men's race had been won by a Kenyan every year from 2002 to 2013, with champions including former marathon world record holder Paul Tergat and New York Marathon winner Martin Lel. The men's course record of 60:42 minutes was set by James Mwangi Macharia in 2005. On the women's side, six nationalities have reached the top of the podium. These include three-time World Cross Country Champion Edith Masai, World Championships track medalist Werknesh Kidane and New York Marathon winner Adriana Fernández. Edna Kiplagat became the first person to take back-to-back victories at the event in 2007. Werknesh Kidane is the women's course record holder with her time of 1:09:48 hours set in 2005.

Past winners

Key:

NOTE: Race was not held in 2020 due to the Covid-19 pandemic.

References

Results
Rock 'n' Roll Virginia Beach - Virginia Beach, Virginia. Retrieved on 2012-04-23.

External links
Official website
Race reports from IAAF: 2006, 2009

Half marathons in the United States
Sports in Virginia Beach, Virginia
Recurring sporting events established in 2001